Antonella Rebuzzi (29 July 1954 – 30 June 2018) was an Italian politician who served as a Senator from 2006 to 2008.

References

1954 births
2018 deaths
Senators of Legislature XV of Italy
Forza Italia politicians
People from Alzano Lombardo